Evening Land is a 1977 Danish drama film directed by English filmmaker Peter Watkins. It was entered into the 10th Moscow International Film Festival.

Cast
 Bent Andersen
 Kai Schøning Andersen
 Mogens Andersen
 Oluf Andersen
 Patricia Bay Andersen
 Steen Andersen
 Peter O. Back
 Niels Baden
 Carsten Baess
 Kent Bajer
 Jon Bang Carlsen

References

External links
 

1977 films
1977 drama films
Danish drama films
1970s Danish-language films
Films directed by Peter Watkins